Edwin Linkomies's cabinet was the 26th government of Republic of Finland. Cabinet's time period was from March 5, 1943 – August 8, 1944. It was a Majority government.

 

Linkomies
1943 establishments in Finland
1944 disestablishments in Finland
Cabinets established in 1943
Cabinets disestablished in 1944